¡México! is a 2010 album of Mexican standards sung by Rolando Villazón with the UK-based Bolívar Soloists and released on DG. Arrangements for chamber ensemble were made by the Venezuelan musician, Gonzalo Grau, leader of the timba band, La Clavé Secreta, and the Venezuelan flautist and composer Efraín Oscher.

Track listing
 Medley of Cielito lindo/Mexico lindo y querido arranged by Gonzalo Grau
 Roberto Cantoral (1935-2010) El reloj, arranged by Daniel Catán
 Daniel Catán: Comprendo, to lyrics by Manuel Acuña (1849–1873)
 Alberto Domínguez (1913-1975) Perfidia, arranged by Efraín Oscher.
 Ignacio Fernández Esperón (1892-1968) Íntima, to lyrics by Ricardo López (1903–1989)
 María Grever (1792-1868) Despedida, arranged by Efraín Oscher,
 Te quiero dijiste, arranged by Daniel Catán and Gonzalo Grau
 Augustin Lara: Veracruz, arranged by Gonzalo Grau
 Noche de ronda, arranged by Efraín Oscher
 Solamente una vez, arranged by Efraín Oscher
 Tomás Méndez (1927-1995): Cucurrucucú paloma, arranged by Gonzalo Grau
 Jorge del Moral: (1900-1941) Besos robados
 Alfonso Esparza Oteo (1894-1950) Dime que sí, arranged by Efraín Oscher
 Un viejo amor arranged by Gonzalo Grau
 Manuel María Ponce (1882-1948) Estrellita, arranged by :de:Alfonso Montes
 Consuelo Velázquez (1916-2005) Besame Mucho, arranged by Efraín Oscher

Chart performance

References

Rolando Villazón albums
2010 classical albums
Spanish-language albums
Covers albums